The 1946 San Diego State Aztecs football team represented San Diego State College during the 1946 college football season.

San Diego State competed in the California Collegiate Athletic Association (CCAA). The team was led by head coach Gander Terry in his first and only season with the Aztecs. They played home games at Balboa Stadium in San Diego, California. The Aztecs finished the season with six wins and four losses (6–4, 2–3 CCAA). Overall, the team outscored its opponents 152–105 for the season.

Schedule

Team players in the NFL
No San Diego State players were selected in the 1947 NFL Draft.

Notes

References

San Diego State
San Diego State Aztecs football seasons
San Diego State Aztecs football